Marc Fortin may refer to:

 Marc-Antoine Fortin (born 1987),Canadian football player 
 Marc-Aurèle Fortin (1888–1970), Québécois painter

See also
 M. A. Fortin (born 1978), Canadian screenwriter